Advanced Placement (AP) Precalculus is a Advanced Placement precalculus course and examination, offered by the College Board, in development since 2021 and announced in May 2022. The course is set to debut in the fall of 2023, with the first exam session taking place in May 2024. The course and examination are designed to teach and assess precalculus concepts, as a foundation for a wide variety of STEM fields and careers, and are not solely designed as preparation for future mathematics courses such as AP Calculus AB/BC.

Purpose
According to the College Board,

Topic outline

Unit 1: Polynomial and Rational Functions (6-6.5 weeks)

Unit 2: Exponential and Logarithmic Functions (6-6.5 weeks)

Unit 3: Trigonometric and Polar Functions (7-7.5 weeks)

Unit 4: Functions Involving Parameters, Vectors, and Matrices (7-7.5 weeks)

Exam
As of September 2022, the Exam will be composed of 2 sections, each with 2 different types of questions. 

Section I will consist of 48 multiple choice questions. 36 will not allow the use of a calculator, while the last 12 will allow a calculator.  The non calculator section will be worth 50% of the exam score, while the calculator section will be worth 16.7%. 

Section II of the Exam will include 4 free response questions, with 2 not allowing a calculator and 2 allowing use of a calculator. Section II will be worth 33.3% of the exam score, with the non-calculator and calculator sections weighed equally.

AP Precalculus exams will be scored on the standard 1-5 AP scale, with 5 signifying that the student is “extremely well qualified” for equivalent college credit and 1 signifying “no recommendation.”

References

Advanced Placement
Mathematics education in the United States